Abezhdan (also Romanized as Ābezhdān; also known as Ābezhdān-e Ābandar) is a city & capital of Abezhdan District, Abezhdan Rural District, Andika County, Khuzestan Province, Iran. At the 2006 census, its population was 789, in 146 families.

References 

Populated places in Andika County
Cities in Khuzestan Province